The Sultanate of Women was a period when wives and mothers of the Sultans of the Ottoman Empire exerted extraordinary political influence.

This phenomenon took place from roughly 1533 to 1656, beginning in the reign of Süleyman the Magnificent, with his marriage to Hürrem Sultan (also known as Roxelana), and ending with the regency of Turhan Sultan. These women were either the wives of the Sultan, referred to as haseki sultans, or the mothers of the Sultan, known as valide sultans. Many of them were of slave origin, as was expected during the sultanate since the traditional idea of marriage was considered inappropriate for the sultan, who was not expected to have any personal allegiances beyond his governmental role. 

During this time, haseki and valide sultans held political and social power, which allowed them to influence the daily running of the empire and undertake philanthropic works as well as to request the construction of buildings such as the large Haseki Sultan Mosque complex and the prominent Valide Sultan Mosque (also known as the Yeni Mosque (Yeni Cami) at Eminönü.

Historical precedents 
This period was novel for the Ottoman Empire but not without precedent since the Seljuk rulers, the predecessors to the Ottomans, often let noble women play an active role in public policy and affairs, despite the resistance of other male officials.

During the fourteenth century, the agency of women in government began to shrink. This was the age of Ottoman expansion where most sultans elected to "lead from the horse", moving around with a court of advisors, viziers, and religious leaders as the army conquered new lands. Ottoman policy from the fifteenth century onwards was to send young princes and their mothers to provincial governorships in Trabzon, Manisa and Amasya in Anatolia. This had the effect of keeping all the women with connections to the higher levels of government away from anywhere where they could hold meaningful power. The practice of fratricide—in which an ascendant sultan would execute all his brothers to secure his throne—made the wives and mothers of princes even more dependent on their men.

Early years 
The situation began to change at the beginning of the 16th century with the concurrence of two significant events: the end of Ottoman expansion, and the absorption of the imperial harem into the palace proper. During the reign of Süleyman the Magnificent, it became clear that the expansion of the empire had reached its limit, with borders stretching thousands of miles in nearly every direction. The sultan could no longer afford to go on extended military campaigns, especially after the failure of the Siege of Vienna.

In addition, Süleyman's reign marked the absorption of the imperial harem into the palace and political sphere as he became the first sultan to be officially married to a woman, later known as Hürrem Sultan. Before the Sultanate of Women, the sultan did not marry but kept a harem of concubines who produced his heirs, with each concubine producing just one son then following him to the province they were assigned to lead instead of remaining in Istanbul.

Hürrem Sultan (Roxelana) 

The first haseki sultan was Roxelana, the wife of Süleyman the Magnificent, who became known as Hürrem Sultan after her conversion to Islam. Hurrem was mistakenly assumed to be of Russian descent, probably because of a mistranslation of her name, and European visitors treated her as Russian. Her ancestry was actually Ruthenian (Kingdom of Poland). Her Turkish name Hürrem meant "Laughing One", or "Joyful" in testament to her character. 

Scholars are unsure when she arrived the imperial harem, since there is no data in the record of concubines, although documents recording the birth of her first son acknowledge her presence in 1521. Her significance was established with her marriage to Süleyman after the death of his mother, when she became the first actual wife of a sultan in more than two hundred years. Since all concubines were technically slaves, Hürrem also became the first concubine to be freed from slavery. The new title of Haseki Sultan (Empress Consort) created for her continued to be given to wives of later sultans.

Hürrem engaged in philanthropy, particularly in the building of communal spaces where subjects could spend time. The most prominent of these was the Haseki Sultan Complex in Istanbul, built in the 1530s, which included a women's medical centre, a school, a mosque, and a soup kitchen for feeding the poor. She died in 1558 in Istanbul, after the deaths of her eldest and youngest sons. Nearly five hundred years after her death, the claim of Russian heritage was removed from her tomb in January 2019.

Political significance 

In the first half of the 17th century, six sultans, several of whom were children, took the throne. As a result, the valide sultans ruled virtually unopposed, both during their sons' periods in power, and during the interregnums. Their prominence was not accepted by everyone. Despite their direct connection to the sultans, the valide sultans often faced opposition from the viziers, as well as from public opinion. Where their male predecessors had won favour with the public through military conquest and charisma, female leaders had to rely on imperial ceremonies and the construction of monuments and public works. Such public works, known as hayrat or works of piety, were often constructed extravagantly in the name of the sultana, as had been the tradition for imperial Islamic women.

Weddings were a common cause for celebration and an opportunity for imperial women to display their wealth and power while also promoting charity. As the daughter of Murad III was about to be married to a prominent admiral, she gave newly minted coins to all the onlookers, some making off with a whole skirt-full of wealth.

The death of a sultan's wife or  mother could inspire even greater extravagance. For example, the death of Hürrem Sultan brought crowds of mourners onto the streets, including the sultan himself, who was normally expected to isolate himself in the palace during the funeral of a family member. On this occasion coins and food were distributed to the funeral attendees as a tribute to the sultana's generous and caring nature.

The most enduring accomplishments of many of the wives and mothers of the sultans were their large public works projects, usually in the form of mosques, schools and monuments. The construction and maintenance of these projects provided crucial economic liquidity during a period otherwise marked by economic stagnation and corruption while also leaving powerful and long-lasting symbols of the sultanate's power and benevolence. While the creation of public works was always an obligation of the sultanate, sultanas such as Süleyman's mother and wife undertook projects that were larger and more lavish than any woman before them - and most men as well.

Kösem Sultan 
Kösem Sultan became the legal wife and most trusted advisor of Sultan Ahmed I. Historians credit her with persuading him to spare the life of his younger half-brother, Mustafa, thus putting an end to the centuries-old practice of fratricide in the Ottoman Empire. After Ahmed died in 1617, she was instrumental in the enthronement of Mustafa I and later become regent during the minority of her son, Murad IV. Kösem wielded unparalleled political power and influenced the empire's foreign and domestic policy.

Turhan Sultan 
Turhan Sultan governed the Ottoman Empire as regent during the minority of her son Mehmed IV, having won a struggle with his grandmother, Kösem Sultan. to take on the role. She also contributed to the empire's defense, spending large amounts of money on the reconstruction and fortification of key military strongholds. When her son Mehmed IV returned from a successful military campaign, Turhan arranged a royal procession to retrace his warpath, and share in the glory of his victory. She was responsible for the construction of the Yeni Mosque (Yeni Cami) at Eminönü.

Opposition 
Although this was a time when imperial women held unprecedented power, they were not without opponents. In 1582, a Grand Vizier openly expressed his anger at a valide sultan's presence in the council. In 1599, the Şeyülislam complained about the valide's involvement in government affairs, especially in appointments and dismissals. In 1640, a Venetian ambassador tried to send a letter to the valide through the grand vizier who refused to transmit it, claiming that she was a mere slave without power of her own. Such opposition implies that the valide sultan held a great deal of authority which the vizier resented. Many contemporary foreign ambassadors reported that those wanting to do business with the Ottoman Empire needed to approach the sultan's mother before anyone else.

Powerful sultanas during the period

Notes

Literature 
 İlhan Akşit. The Mystery of the Ottoman Harem. Akşit Kültür Turizm Yayınları. 
 Kathernie Nouri Hughes "The Mapmaker's Daughter"  The Confessions of Nurbanu Sultan, 1525-1583.
Leslie P. Peirce. The Imperial Harem: Women and Sovereignty in the Ottoman Empire.  Oxford University Press (1993).

External links 
Channel 4 History | The sultanate of women

 
Reigns